The Jackson County Jail and Marshal's House in Independence, Missouri, United States is a building constructed in 1859 to serve as a county jail for Jackson County, Missouri.  It served in this capacity until 1933, when it was decommissioned and replaced with another structure.  More recently, it has been restored and opened to the public as a museum. It was listed on the National Register of Historic Places in 1970.

Construction
The jail was constructed in 1859 using a design by A. B. Cross, a notable early architect in Kansas City, Missouri.  It consisted of a home for the countymarshal, with twelve limestone jail cells located at the rear of the residence.  A brick structure was added on to the rear of the original jail in 1907, to house chain gangs who worked on roads, sewers and other public projects.

The marshal lived with his family in the Marshal's residence, which was the front half of the structure.  The marshal's wife often cooked meals for the prisoners, as well as her own family, in a small kitchen at the back of the house.  The Marshal was paid about $50 per month, plus the use of the house, for his services.  The marshal's office formed part of the residence, but had a separate entryway from the house.  The jail consisted of six upstairs and six downstairs cells, with two-foot thick walls of limestone blocks.  A single kerosene lamp in the hallway provided the only light at night.  Two doors, one of grated iron and one of solid iron, were provided for each cell, as was a window covered with grated iron that permitted wind from the outside to enter.  The cells were not heated, and some prisoners incarcerated inside died of exposure during the jail's history.  Each cell was six by nine feet and designed to hold three prisoners, though during the Civil War, as many as twenty prisoners were confined in each one.

Some of the crimes for which a person could be imprisoned in the jail prior to the Civil War included: horse racing on public streets, firing guns in town, operating a gaming house, assault and battery, disturbing the peace, disturbing a religious meeting, or building a privy "not over a pit".

Famous prisoners
During the American Civil War, the jail held both military and civilian prisoners, and served as the U.S. Provost Marshal's office.  William Clark Quantrill, the famous Confederate guerrilla leader, was briefly incarcerated there, as were those who refused to take a pro-Union loyalty oath.  After the war, its most famous inmate would be Frank James, older brother to the famous outlaw Jesse James, who spent almost six months here in the 1880s.  During his time at the jail, James' cell was furnished with a Brussels carpet, fine furniture and paintings, and he was permitted free run of the jail and hosted card games in his cell at night.  Frank James' cell is preserved as it was when he occupied it, as part of the modern museum.

References

External links
 1859 Jail, Marshal's Home and Museum - Jackson County Historical Society, contains photos of the jail.

Houses on the National Register of Historic Places in Missouri
Federal architecture in Missouri
Houses completed in 1859
Buildings and structures in Independence, Missouri
Museums in Jackson County, Missouri
Prison museums in the United States
History museums in Missouri
Houses in Jackson County, Missouri
National Register of Historic Places in Jackson County, Missouri